René Trehkopf (born 8 April 1980 in Altdöbern) is a German footballer who plays for FC Energie Cottbus II.

Career 
He made his professional debut in the 2. Bundesliga for FC Energie Cottbus on 15 April 2000 when he started in a game against Tennis Borussia Berlin.

References

External links 
 

1980 births
Living people
People from Altdöbern
People from Bezirk Cottbus
German footballers
Footballers from Brandenburg
Association football defenders
2. Bundesliga players
3. Liga players
FC Energie Cottbus players
FC Energie Cottbus II players
Dresdner SC players
FC Erzgebirge Aue players
VfL Osnabrück players
Dynamo Dresden players
Chemnitzer FC players